Camp Downey was an early training camp for California Volunteers, overlooking Lake Merritt, on what is now Seventh Avenue in Oakland, California.

Camp Downey was established on August 31, 1861 by Lieutenant Colonel Joseph R. West with the 1st Infantry, California Volunteers.  After September 15, 1861 the camp was abandoned as the Volunteers took ship for Camp Latham in Southern California to suppress secessionists disturbances there.

References

Camp Downey
Camp Downey
History of Oakland, California
Formerly Used Defense Sites in California
Military facilities in the San Francisco Bay Area
1861 establishments in California